Pierce County is the name of five counties in the United States.:

Pierce County, Georgia 
Pierce County, Nebraska 
Pierce County, North Dakota
Pierce County, Washington
Pierce County, Wisconsin